Caedesa is a genus of moths of the family Euteliidae. The genus was erected by Francis Walker in 1862.

Species
Caedesa agropoides Walker, 1862 Borneo, Sumatra
Caedesa angulifera (Walker, [1863]) Borneo, Sumatra
Caedesa apicenigra (Warren, 1914) Malaysia

References

Euteliinae
Noctuoidea genera